Brachyrhynchocyon is an extinct genus of terrestrial carnivore, which belonged to the family Amphicyonidae ("bear dogs") of the suborder Caniformia.

References

Bear dogs
Eocene mammals of North America
Oligocene mammals of North America
Prehistoric carnivoran genera